The White Rabbit is a fictional and anthropomorphic character in Lewis Carroll's 1865 book Alice's Adventures in Wonderland. He appears at the very beginning of the book, in chapter one, wearing a waistcoat, and muttering "Oh dear! Oh dear! I shall be too late!" Alice follows him down the rabbit hole into Wonderland. Alice encounters him again when he mistakes her for his housemaid Mary Ann and she becomes trapped in his house after growing too large. The Rabbit shows up again in the last few chapters, as a herald-like servant of the King and Queen of Hearts.

Personality

In his article "Alice on the Stage", Carroll wrote, "And the White Rabbit, what of him? Was he framed on the 'Alice' lines, or meant as a contrast? As a contrast, distinctly. For her 'youth', 'audacity', 'vigour', and 'swift directness of purpose', read 'elderly', 'timid', 'feeble', and 'nervously shilly-shallying', and you will get something of what I meant him to be. I think the White Rabbit should wear spectacles. I'm sure his voice should quaver, and his knees quiver and his whole air suggest a total inability to say 'Boo' to a goose!"

Overall, the White Rabbit seems to shift back and forth between pompous behaviour toward his underlings, such as his servants, and grovelling, obsequious behaviour toward his superiors, such as the Duchess, and the King and Queen of Hearts, in direct contrast to Alice, who is reasonably polite to everyone she meets.

The White Rabbit's perennial unpunctuality is a nod to Oxford time, the tradition at Oxford (and especially Christ Church, where Carroll taught) of having events begin five minutes past the scheduled hour.

Adaptations

Disney film

Disney's animated version of the Rabbit is perhaps best known for the little song he sings on his first appearance, "I'm late! I'm late! For a very important date! No time to say hello, goodbye! I'm late! I'm late! I'm late!". His initial panicky behaviour is presumably because he is late for the royal garden party where he is due to act as herald; this would be quite enough for him to lose his head to the touchy Queen.

He is often the straight man for other characters' zany antics; when he asks the Dodo for help on getting the "monster" (Alice) out of his house, Dodo's ultimate solution is to burn the house down, to which the White Rabbit is greatly opposed. At the Mad Tea Party, the Mad Hatter and the March Hare try to "fix" his watch, proclaiming it "exactly two days slow," and eventually destroy it in their efforts to correct it.

The Rabbit was voiced by Bill Thompson.

The White Rabbit made a few appearances on the Disney Channel original show, House of Mouse. His most notable appearance was in the episode "Clarabelle's Big Secret" when he confessed to Clarabelle Cow that "I'm not really late, and I don't really have a date. I'm a fraud!". He is seen being grabbed by the reservation clerk Daisy Duck in the show's intro. He was voiced by Corey Burton, who has voiced the Rabbit in all English speaking roles for the character since then. In Aladdin and the King of Thieves, the genie was transformed into him.

The White Rabbit appears at the Walt Disney Parks and Resorts as a meetable character.

In the PlayStation 2 action-RPG game Kingdom Hearts and its Game Boy Advance follow-up, Kingdom Hearts: Chain of Memories, the White Rabbit leads Sora, Donald Duck and Goofy to the Queen's palace, worried about being late. His Japanese voice actor was Shigeru Ushiyama.

In episode "Potato Potahto" of Alice's Wonderland Bakery, Alice and the White Rabbit made the potato dish together in Wonderland.

Tim Burton film

The White Rabbit works for the Red Queen, but is also a secret member of the Underland Underground Resistance, and was sent by the Hatter to search for Alice. Actor Michael Sheen stated, "The White Rabbit is such an iconic character that I didn't feel like I should break the mould too much."  In this film adaption, the White Rabbit is given the name Nivens McTwisp.

McTwisp appears in the video game adaptation of Tim Burton's Alice in Wonderland as a playable character. He attacks using his watch and can manipulate time.

Švankmajer film

The 1988 Czechoslovak film Alice, noted for its disturbing interpretation of Carroll's story, shows a dark stop-motion version of the character. At the beginning of the film, the White Rabbit starts out as a stuffed rabbit that comes alive in Alice's bedroom and breaks out of his glass case; he leaks sawdust through a hole in his chest. During Alice's pursuit of the White Rabbit in Wonderland, he physically attacks her with paddles, a hacksaw, and a group of skeletal animals. The White Rabbit is also the Queen of Hearts' executioner, using scissors to behead the Mad Hatter, the March Hare, and other characters. Upon awakening from her dream and finding the White Rabbit missing from his case, Alice finds his scissors and resolves to behead him herself.

In popular culture

Television
The White Rabbit appears in the Once Upon a Time spin-off called Once Upon a Time in Wonderland voiced by John Lithgow - in this show, his first name is revealed to be Percy. He helps the Knave of Hearts to free Alice from Bethlem Royal Hospital in a Victorian Era-type world and bring her back to Wonderland. The Red Queen is also forcing the White Rabbit to be her ears in order to find out about Alice's plans.
 In Star Trek, the 1966 episode "Shore Leave" shows the protagonists visiting a planet where characters of their imagination come to life. The White Rabbit appears to Doctor McCoy early in the episode.
 In Star Trek: The Animated Series, the 1973 episode Once Upon a Planet, the White Rabbit appears before Alice shows up chasing him.
 The White Rabbit appeared in the "Brooke Shields" episode of The Muppet Show performed by Steve Whitmire. The White Rabbit puppet later made a cameo in the wedding scene of The Muppets Take Manhattan, an episode of Donna's Day, and episode 4081 of Sesame Street (where its ears were in the downward position).
 In the Syfy Alice, The White Rabbit is a secret organisation that works for the Queen of Hearts and abducts people from the real world, so they can gamble in the Queen's casino. The actual character is represented by a member of the organisation called Agent White who kidnaps Jack (Alice's fiancé, the Jack of Hearts) and tries to retrieve a magic ring called the Stone of Wonderland from Alice. When it is found out that he failed his mission, the Queen has him executed.
 In Lost, the White Rabbit has alluded to several times in the series. First, it is the name of an episode, and Locke claims that Jack  is chasing the White Rabbit in the form of his father. The White Rabbit is also the symbol for the Looking Glass Station and it is also carrying a clock with it.
 In Leverage Season 5, the White Rabbit is being mentioned in episode 12 as being the main title and con of the episode.

Films
 In Jurassic Park, the character of Dennis Nedry writes a computer program to disable security systems of the park and hide his steps. Samuel L. Jackson's character finds a file called "Whte_rbt.obj" that he claims did it all.
 In The Matrix, there are several metaphysical "waking up" metaphors that reference the Wonderland stories. Early in the film, Neo is told to follow the "White Rabbit" and seconds later, his doorbell rings, and when he opens the door he finds a woman with a tattoo of a white rabbit on her shoulder. Later in the film, Morpheus offers him the "red pill" to "find out just how deep the rabbit hole goes". Right before he meets the Oracle one can see Night of the Lepus playing on a nearby television, symbolising Neo's decision to "follow the white rabbit" and to disturb the order of the Matrix.
 In Pacific Rim, there are several metaphysical "waking up" metaphors that reference the Wonderland stories. In the film, Mako Mori is instructed during "mind-meld" training to "do not latch onto memories; let them wash over you" and to above all never follow the "White Rabbit". Later in the film, she does this and nearly kills military staff members.
 In Aladdin and the King of Thieves, Genie briefly transforms into the White Rabbit and even quotes his famous line of "I'm late, I'm late, for a very important date!" (in context, it was due to Genie being late regarding actually announcing the arrival of the bride and groom for Jasmine and Aladdin's wedding upon realizing the guests have already seated).

Shorts
 In The Simpsons short Plusaversary the White Rabbit made a brief appearance in Moe's Tavern.

Literature
 In The Looking-Glass Wars, the White Rabbit is re-imagined as Bibwit Harte (an anagram of "White Rabbit"), an albino tutor with super-sensitive hearing.
 In the manga series Alice in the Country of Hearts, written by Quinrose and published by Tokyopop, a character named Peter White is the prime minister of the castle of hearts. He is portrayed as a cruel man who would kill anyone in an instant. He has little in common with the image of the white rabbit other than white rabbit ears, a large oversized pocketwatch, and a suit. He is desperately in love with Alice and often caught rhyming as he speaks. Alice does mention hating him on several occasions and claims to hate "White Rabbit ears" the most.
 In the Stephen King novel The Long Walk, a boy named Stebbins refers to himself as "the White Rabbit type."
 In the manga Pandora Hearts the main character Oz Vessalius is based in the White Rabbit as he is the chain B-Rabbit.
 In the manga series Project ARMS a boy infected with intelligent nano machines code named white rabbit is granted superior speed and jumping ability.
 In the third volume of Shazam!, the White Rabbit is an inhabitant of the Magiclands location called Wozenderlands. He was seen carrying the Tin Man's axe to give to Dorothy while evading the wrongful advice of the talking trees. When the winged monkeys that worked for the Wicked Witches of the North, South, East, and West pursue him, the White Rabbit is saved by Mamaragan, Eugene Choi, and Pedro Peña. Afterwards, Mamaragan asks where Alice is. The White Rabbit then accompanies them to meet up with Alice and Dorothy Gale. As the group roasts apples and cucumbers at the campfire later that night, the White Rabbit learns of Eugene and Pedro's trip through the Funlands and the Gamelands. When everyone meets up in the Wozenderlands after Shazam and Lady Shazam protected Scarecrow and the Munchkins from the Cheshire Cat, White Rabbit gives Scarecrow the axe that belonged to the Tin Man while apologising for what the Queen of Hearts and her Card Soldiers did to him. When Mister Mind has Shazam cast a spell to unite the seven Magiclands, Scarecrow and White Rabbit start to see the effects of it.

Music
 Jefferson Airplane released Grace Slick's song "White Rabbit" on their 1967 album Surrealistic Pillow, with references to the white rabbit character and the Wonderland saga in general as metaphors for drug-induced experiences.
 Electric Six's song "Feed my Fuckin' Habit" makes reference to this with the lyrics "Feed my fuckin' habit... Follow the white rabbit" (album I Shall Exterminate Everything Around Me That Restricts Me from Being the Master, 2007).
 My Life with the Thrill Kill Kult's song "A Daisy Chain 4 Satan" has references of a white rabbit in their lyrics about drugs: "I live for drugs... I'm the white rabbit. I freaked out on acid... I'm the white rabbit."
 Egypt Central's song "White Rabbit" makes references to the rabbit: "Your magic white rabbit has left its writing on the wall. We followed like Alice, and just kept falling down the hole."
 Shinedown's song "Her Name is Alice", from the compilation album Almost Alice, uses the line "And the girl that chased the rabbit, drank the wine, and took the pill..." to reference the White Rabbit; the rest of the song also references Alice in Wonderland and Through the Looking Glass.
 Vladimir Vysotsky's song "Белый кролик, Алиса и Додо" ("White Rabbit, Alice and Dodo").
 Marilyn Manson created an album and song titled "Eat Me, Drink Me" in reference to the cookies and drinks labelled "Eat Me, Drink Me" that throughout the story of Alice in Wonderland cause her to grow and shrink. The entire song constantly alludes to the story and characters of Alice in Wonderland, and describes a darker side of the story.
 Mindy Gledhill released a song "Rabbit Hole", in which she metaphorically compares following one's calling to falling through the rabbit hole, which is terrifying, but also wonderful and beautiful.

Musical
 The White Rabbit appeared as a banished fairy tale creature in the original Broadway musical Shrek (based on the 2001 film) played by Noah Rivera.
 The White Rabbit was portrayed by Edward Staudenmayer in Frank Wildhorn's musical Wonderland. In the show, he is portrayed as a panicky character with a sarcastic sense of humour. Staudenmayer praised the character's role in the story, saying, "Everything [he has] to say is funny or important." As well as the character that brings Alice to Wonderland in the first place, the Rabbit is also a close ally of her during the course of the show. His sole weapon is his pocket watch, which can turn back time; he uses it to help himself, El Gato the Cheshire Cat, Caterpillar, and Jack the White Knight escape from prison towards the end of the show.
 In the musical Alice By Heart actor Colton Ryan plays the role of the White Rabbit and its human counterpart Alfred Hallam.

Video games
In the Sunsoft's 2006 mobile game , the White Rabbit served as the "Guardian" for Ariko (the "Alice" of the game) when she is a young child and was the one in charge of adsorbing Ariko's negative emotions (as Wonderland is her coping mechanism to deal with her traumatic childhood). However, after absorbing too much of Ariko's emotions for years, the White Rabbit has become deranged and murderous. Throughout most of the game, he appears as a mirage to Ariko and is confronted in person after Ariko learns that the White Rabbit has been disguising himself as her female friend "Yukino" in the real world. In his real form, the White Rabbit has a very humanoid body and wears human clothes, which is heavily suggested to resemble Ariko's deceased father.
 In American McGee's Alice, the White Rabbit is responsible for Alice's return to Wonderland. He is first seen as Alice's soft toy, then becomes something that resembles a shrivelled version of the John Tenniel illustration. When Alice is chasing him in the Village of the Doomed, he shrinks and goes down a hole. Alice follows him by shrinking herself with a hand-made potion. They meet again in the Wonderland Woods, where he tells her to find Caterpillar. Later, he is killed by the Mad Hatter who crushes him under his foot but is revived after Alice defeated the Queen of Hearts. He reappears as a minor character in the sequel Alice Madness Returns, first in the opening sequence of the game, and then as a host of some mini-games (along with the Mad Hatter).
 In the Nintendo DS RPG A Witch's Tale, the White Rabbit forces its way before the main character Liddell. It can be an unlockable plush for fighting too.
 Rockstar's game Manhunt features a level called "Kill the Rabbit." In this stage, the player hunts down a man wearing a white rabbit suit, which the game's antagonist describes as "Wonderland fun".
 In the  Eye of the North expansion of Guild Wars, finding the boss Nulfastu Earthbound requires the player to follow a white rabbit into a rabbit hole. When the player enters, the boss appears, along with a large amount of other hostile monsters, that easily overwhelms an unprepared group of players.
 There is a reference to the White Rabbit in Castlevania: Aria of Sorrow.
 In Super Mario 64 MIPS the rabbit references the White Rabbit with a few lines, such as "I'm late for an important date."
 In The Legend of Zelda: Ocarina of Time, one of the NPCs in Hyrule Castle Town's square is running in a circle and says "I'm late, I'm late, for a very important date."
 In Heart no Kuni no Alice, a dating sim game made for the PC, PSP, and the PS2 with the theme of Alice in Wonderland, has a man named "Peter White" in which Peter White takes the role of the White Rabbit in Wonderland.
 In Dead or Alive Xtreme Venus Vacation, the 4.5 anniversary event had Luna play the role of the White Rabbit, including drawing the Owner to Wonderland after fleeing (though in this case in response to a telling off from Misaki).
 In Black Souls 2, the White Rabbit Node acts as the players closest companion during their search for Alice. She is later revealed to be one of the ones keeping him trapped in Wonderland. Her love for the play leads to her refusing to allow them to leave, instead wanting them to stay within her grasp forever.

Other Influences
A military trench-digging machine developed by the British Royal Navy at the beginning of World War II was originally known as White Rabbit No. 6, but the name was changed to Cultivator No. 6 to conceal its identity.

In the 2010s, the phrase "Follow the White Rabbit" became popular among QAnon adherents, as the initiator of the conspiracy theory often used it to encourage his followers to do their own research about the purported "cabal" running the United States.

References

External links
 White Rabbit character description
 TSR Modules EX1-2, Dungeonland and The Land Beyond the Magic Mirror - article on the modules and download links

Rabbits and hares in literature
Anthropomorphic rabbits and hares
Fictional English people
Fictional anthropomorphic characters
Lewis Carroll characters
Male characters in film
Male characters in literature
Male characters in television
Literary characters introduced in 1865